Inducement may refer to:
 Incentive, persuading a person to alter their behaviour
 Bribery, a gift to influence an official

See also
 Inducement prize contest, a competition to reward a feat, usually of engineering
 Inducement rule, a copyright test used in United States courts
 Induce (disambiguation)
 Induction (disambiguation)